USS Scourge was an American warship converted from a confiscated Canadian merchant schooner. She and the American warship  foundered at 2:00am on Sunday, August 8, 1813 during a squall on Lake Ontario. during the War of 1812.

Scourge began its career as the schooner Lord Nelson, named after the famous British Admiral Horatio Nelson. The schooner was built at Niagara-on-the-Lake in Upper Canada for merchant James Crooks and launched on May 1, 1811 as an unarmed merchant schooner to carry freight between Upper Canadian ports. The US Navy illegally seized Lord Nelson on June 9, 1812, almost two weeks before the War of 1812, on suspicion of smuggling. The schooner was on a voyage from Prescott, Upper Canada to Niagara, Upper Canada (then known as Newark) carrying freight and personal luggage when Lt. Melancthon T. Woolsey, captain of the American warship USS Oneida, detained her. Woolsey accused Lord Nelsons master of smuggling American goods in violation of the Embargo Act of 1807, which forbade trading between the United States and British colonies. The schooner was taken to the US naval base at Sackets Harbor, New York. Although there was no proof of smuggling and the schooner's owner James Crooks immediately went to Sackets Harbour to dispute the seizure, the onset of war prevented the return of his vessel.

The US Navy commissioned the schooner at Sackets Harbor and renamed it USS Scourge. For naval service it was armed with four 6-pounder cannons and four 4-pounder cannons, and fitted with bulwarks. The schooner was placed in Captain Isaac Chauncey's squadron and patrolled Lake Ontario during the War of 1812.

About 84 men perished when the Hamilton and Scourge sank during a sudden squall off-shore from Fourteen Mile Creek, east of present-day Hamilton, Ontario around 2:00 am on Sunday August 8, 1813. Scourge was under the command of Sailing Master Joseph Osgood. According to a Letter of August 1813 after both ships were lost, a total of sixteen members of the crews survived. A survivor of the Scourge, Ned Myers, told his story to James Fenimore Cooper. According to Myers about eight men from the Scourge were saved, and about 42 were lost.

The site of the sunken ships was designated a National Historic Site of Canada in 1976. The Ontario Heritage Act was amended in 2005 to provide special protection to the shipwrecks of the Hamilton, the Scourge, and the SS Edmund Fitzgerald because of their historical and cultural significance and because they contain human remains.

After the war, the schooner's original owner James Crooks, resumed his claim for the schooner. On July 11, 1817, the Court of Northern District of New York, determined that the vessel had been seized illegally. Despite the court's decision, compensation to the Crooks family was not paid because the clerk of the court had embezzled the funds. Crook's descendants persisted and finally won compensation for the schooner 97 years later, in 1914, thanks to the determination of Henry James Bethune. The award was $5000, plus 93 years of interest. Total compensation came to $23,644.38, reduced to $15,546.63 after deduction of legal expenses, and was paid by the United States government to the 25 descendants of James Crooks.

References

Great Lakes ships
1811 ships
Captured ships
War of 1812 ships of the United States
Shipwrecks of Lake Ontario
Maritime incidents in 1813
19th century in Hamilton, Ontario
Ships built in Ontario
Merchant ships of Canada